This is a sortable list of triathlon fatalities.

It contains information on athletes who died as a result of competing in a triathlon or duathlon.

References 

triathlon
History of swimming
fatalities
Dynamic lists